The 2006 New York Comptroller Election took place on November 7, 2006 with the incumbent, Alan Hevesi winning against Republican challenger Chris Callaghan. Hevesi was plagued by scandals during the campaign involving misuse of state funds. Hevesi won the election, resigning a few days before his second term would have begun.

Democratic Party
Alan Hevesi is the incumbent Comptroller of the State of New York. A Democrat and former professor, Hevesi was first elected State Comptroller in 2002.  Hevesi served two terms as New York City Comptroller from 1994 to 2002, when he was term-limited out of the office.  He was being investigated for using a state employee as a chauffeur for his wife and failing to keep records or reimburse the State of NY by the Albany County District Attorney and was found to violate state law by the New York State Ethics Commission.

Republican Party
Christopher Callaghan, the Republican candidate, served as the Treasurer of Saratoga County, New York from 1997 to 2006.  He was first appointed by Governor George Pataki in 1997, and elected to a full term later that year. He was reelected twice.

Third Parties

On the ballot
Julia Willebrand (Green), educator and peace activist
John Cain (Libertarian), insurance broker
Willie Cotton (Socialist Workers), journalist and former candidate for congress

No ballot access
Michael Cronmiller (Right to Life), failed to obtain required signatures for 2006 election cycle

Comptroller election background

Nominee Alan Hevesi and the Democratic ticket
Alan Hevesi was the nominee of the Democratic Party for Comptroller. He served as Comptroller of New York City from 1994 to 2001 when he attempted a run for Mayor of New York City. Failing that, Hevesi ran for state Comptroller in 2002 defeating Republican challenger John Faso. In 2006, controversial allegations regarding Hevesi's tenure as Comptroller arose including admitted use of a state employee as a chauffeur for his wife and the purported use of state employees along the campaign trail. At a commencement address he delivered at Queens College on June 1, 2006, Hevesi told his audience that Senator Charles Schumer was so tough he would "put a bullet between the president's eyes if he could get away with it." Several hours after his remarks, Hevesi apologized for his comments, calling them "beyond dumb," "remarkably stupid" and "incredibly moronic."

On October 12, 2006, Albany County District Attorney David Soares' office acknowledged that it is officially investigating actions by Hevesi regarding the public employee hired to chauffeur his wife. If Hevesi is found to have violated state ethics laws, he could be fined or possibly removed from office. On October 16, 2006, Hevesi yielded control over his office to longtime political consultant Hank Morris.

On October 23, 2006 the New York State Ethics Commission deemed that Hevesi's actions involving the chauffeur violated state law, finding that:
Hevesi used two state employees as drivers
One of the drivers used a car owned by the state
There was a "low threat risk" against Hevesi's wife with no documented threats against her and only one against him – which they discounted as not serious
Hevesi never intended to reimburse the state

On October 26, 2006, Democratic gubernatorial candidate Eliot Spitzer withdrew his endorsement of Hevesi saying, "Recent developments in the Comptroller's race are deeply troubling. The outcome of the Ethics Commission investigation presents information that compromises Alan Hevesi's ability to fulfill his responsibilities."

On November 4, 2006, Hevesi was ordered to pay an additional $90,000. "Considering the record as a whole, I believe there is a preponderance of evidence that the comptroller knowingly and intentionally violated New York's public officers law," Kelley said in his 24-page report to Pataki.

Nominee Christopher Callaghan and the Republican ticket
Christopher Callaghan was the nominee of the Republican Party for Comptroller. Callaghan was Treasurer for Saratoga County from 1997 to early 2006 when he resigned to begin his campaign for state comptroller. There were reports that state party leaders were trying to recruit Rockland County Executive C. Scott Vanderhoef to run for comptroller against Treasurer Callaghan. Vanderhoef announced that he was not running for comptroller and instead announced his candidacy for lieutenant governor. Callaghan spent much of the summer travelling to the many county fairs throughout New York.

On September 21, 2006, Alan Hevesi admitted that he hired an employee of the state to drive around his wife after Callaghan made a public statement on the matter and called the "Comptroller's hotline." Callaghan used the Comptroller's hotline during the campaign to call in misuses of government funds specifically found in Hevesi's office.

Newspaper endorsements
Poughkeepsie Journal: Callaghan
New York Sun: Callaghan
New York Post: Callaghan
Times Herald-Record: Callaghan
Newsday: Callaghan
The New York Times: Callaghan
New York Daily News: Hevesi
Buffalo News: Callaghan
Brooklyn Papers: Callaghan
Rochester Democrat and Chronicle: Callaghan
Jamestown Post Journal
Troy Record: Callaghan
Syracuse Post Standard: Callaghan

Opinion polls

† Of voters polled in Albany, Rensselaer, Saratoga and Schenectady counties.

Election results

Dates
A debate was held on October 25, 2006 by NY1.
The election was held on November 7, 2006.

See also
Election results, New York Comptroller
New York gubernatorial election, 2006
New York United States Senate election, 2006
New York attorney general election, 2006

References

External links
Chris Callaghan's 2006 campaign website
New York State Office of the Comptroller

Comptroller
2006
New York